This is a list of people executed in the United States in 2007. Forty-two people were executed in the United States in 2007. Twenty-six of them were in the state of Texas. One (Daryl Keith Holton) was executed via electrocution. Holton, who waived his appeals and chose the electric chair, was the first person to be electrocuted by the state of Tennessee since 1960. The state of South Dakota carried out its first execution since 1947. In September 2007, executions in the United States were halted, due to certiorari in Baze v. Rees, which questioned the constitutionality of lethal injection. The U.S. Supreme Court stayed all executions until a decision was made. The stay was not lifted until May 2008.

List of people executed in the United States in 2007

Demographics

Executions in recent years

See also
 List of death row inmates in the United States
 List of most recent executions by jurisdiction
 List of people scheduled to be executed in the United States
 List of women executed in the United States since 1976

References

List of people executed in the United States
executed
People executed in the United States
2007